Almost Love (lit. "Youth Comic") is a 2006 South Korean film. It was directed by Lee Han, starring Kwon Sang-woo and Kim Ha-neul. Distributed by Showbox, it was released on March 23, 2006, and ran at 116 minutes.

Plot 
Ji-hwan is a taekwondo student with a part-time job as a stunt man, who dreams of becoming Korea's answer to Jackie Chan. Dal-rae is a drama student and aspiring actress, but tends to fail auditions because of her timid personality. The two are old friends who have grown up together, but their relationship becomes complicated when they each start dating other people.

Cast 
 Kwon Sang-woo as Ji-hwan
 Park Ji-bin as young Ji-hwan
 Kim Ha-neul as Dal-rae
 Jung Min-ah as young Dal-rae
 Lee Sang-woo as Moon Young-hoon
 Jang Mi-inae as Kim Ji-min
 Jung Gyu-soo as Dal-rae's father
 Choi Jong-ryul
 Kang Ki-hwa
 Lee Young-lan
 Lee Kyung-jin as Jin Dal-rae's mother
 Park Kyeong-hwan
 Ku Hye-ryeong
 Jo Deok-je

Release 
Almost Love was released in South Korea on March 23, 2006, and topped the box office on its opening weekend with 539,307 admissions.

References

External links 
  
 
 
 

2006 films
2000s Korean-language films
Showbox films
Films directed by Lee Han
South Korean romantic drama films
2000s South Korean films